The Palm Treo 700w is a Windows Mobile-powered smartphone that was officially announced on September 26, 2005. As Palm's first Windows Mobile-powered Treo, the 700w offered an alternative for users who want or need to use Microsoft software. It was offered by Verizon Wireless, and other CDMA carriers. A newer version of this phone has been released, the Treo 700wx.

Improvements to Windows Mobile
Palm updated the Windows Mobile today screen, making it much easier to dial the phone. The user can type a couple of letters of the recipient's name to select their phone number.

There is on-screen support for voice mail. Instead of waiting for numbered prompts (or needing to memorize them), the user can select an action with left-and-right arrow keys. This feature is customizable for additional voicemail (not just Verizon's), enabling the user to access work voicemail (which may have different numbered prompts from Verizon's).

Specifications
 Mobile phone, CDMA model with 800/1900-MHz bands, CDMA2000 1x and CDMA2000 EV-DO networks
 Intel PXA272 312 MHz processor with Intel XScale Technology
128 MB (60 MB user-available) non-volatile memory (64 MB on older models)
 Removable rechargeable lithium ion battery
 Windows Mobile 5.0.2.x Pocket PC Phone Edition
 4.4 H x 2.3 W x 0.9 D inches (11.3 x 5.9 x 2.3 cm)
 6.4 oz. (180 grams)
 16-bit Color 240 x 240 2.5 in. TFT touchscreen display
 Supports SD, SDIO and MultiMediaCards
 Built-In Bluetooth 1.2 Compliance
 1.3-megapixel (1280x1024 resolution) digital camera with 2x digital zoom and video camera capability
 Talk time: up to 4.7 hours, standby time: up to 15 days
 No integrated Wi-fi support (Wi-fi card sold separately)
Built-in keyboard
Comes with stylus

See also
 Treo 700p — Corresponding Palm OS device.
 Treo 700wx - Corresponding, newer Windows Mobile device offered by Sprint Wireless.

External links
Official Palm product page
Product info at Engadget
Official press release from Palm
Review at Mobiletechreview.com
Pocket PC Magazine

References

Windows Mobile Professional devices
Palm mobile phones